is a railway station on the Osaka Loop Line in Tennoji-ku, Osaka, Japan, operated by West Japan Railway Company (JR West).

Station layout 
This station has two elevated side platforms serving two tracks. The station has a Midori no Madoguchi staffed ticket office.

Platforms

Adjacent stations

History
It was renamed Momodani Station on 1 March 1905.

Station numbering was introduced in March 2018 with Momodani being assigned station number JR-O03.

Surrounding area 

 Osaka Police Hospital
Daini Osaka Police Hospital
 Momodani Shopping Arcade

Schools
 Osaka Prefectural Yuhigaoka High School
 Osaka Prefectural Tennoji Shogyo High School
 Poole Gakuin Junior and Senior High Schools

Bus stops 
Osaka City Bus (Momodani-ekimae)
Route 22: for Suwa Jinja-mae via Tennoji Kuyakusho, Tennoji Kumin Center and Uehommachi Rokuchome / for Abenobashi via Teradacho
Route 73: for Namba via Tsuruhashi-ekimae and Uehommachi Rokuchome / for  via Kumata
Kintetsu Bus (JR Momodani Station)
Route 66 for  via Osaka Police Hospital (No operations on Saturdays, Sundays, Holidays and from December 30 till January 4)

References

External links

  

Ikuno-ku, Osaka
Osaka Loop Line
Railway stations in Osaka
Railway stations in Japan opened in 1895
Stations of West Japan Railway Company